Forest reserve(s) may refer to: 

 Nature reserves made up in part or whole of forests

It may also refer to: 

 Forest Reserve Act of 1891, United States
 Headwaters Forest Reserve, the only forest reserve in the United States
 Recreational Forest Reserve of Pinhal da Paz, Azores
 Reserved forests and protected forests of India

Or to: 

 Nottingham Forest F.C. Under-21s Squad and Academy, West Bridgford, Nottinghamshire, England

See also 
 List of countries by forest area
 List of types of formally designated forests
 Biosphere reserve
 Protected area